Béarn or Bearn can refer to:

Places
 Béarn, a former province of France
 Estates of Béarn, the former Provincial Estates of Béarn
 Fors de Bearn, or fueros of Béarn, are a series of former legal texts in the Viscounty of Béarn
 Viscounty of Béarn, a former province of France
 Béarn, Quebec, a municipality in Canada

People
 Alexander Gordon Bearn (1923–2009), American physician, scientist and author
 Pierre Béarn (1902–2004), French writer
 Viscounts of Béarn

Other
 Béarn 6, an airplane
 Béarn AOC, a wine of South West France
 Bearn beaked dace (Leuciscus bearnensis), species of cyprinid fish
 French aircraft carrier Béarn

See also 
 
 Bern (disambiguation)